Therochelonia is a group of dicynodont therapsids. The group was named by British paleontologist Harry Seeley in 1894 and fell into disuse in the following century. Therochelonia was redefined as a node-based clade in 2009. It is defined as the last common ancestor of Cistecephalus microrhinus and Dicynodon lacerticeps, and all of its descendants. Below is a simplified cladogram from Kammerer et al. (2011) showing the phylogenetic placement of Therochelonia:

References

Dicynodonts
Lopingian first appearances
Early Cretaceous extinctions